Athanasiadis or Athanasiades is a Greek surname. The female version of the name is Athanasiadi (Αθανασιάδη) or Athanasiadou (Αθανασιάδου). Athanasiadis is a patronymic surname which literally means "the son of Athanasios (Thanasis)". Notable individuals include:

Men 
 Anestis Athanasiadis (born 1972), Greek footballer
 Christos Athanasiadis (born 1978), Greek footballer
 Christos Athanasiadis (born 1979), Greek footballer
 Georgios Athanasiadis-Novas (1893-1987), Greek lawyer, politician and Prime Minister
 Georgios Athanasiadis (born 1962), Greek wrestler
 Giorgos Athanasiadis (born 1993), Greek footballer
 Giorgos Athanasiadis (born 1963), Greek footballer
 Iason Athanasiadis, British-Greek writer, photographer, political analyst and TV producer
 Marios Athanasiadis (born 1986), Cypriot biker
 Stefanos Athanasiadis (born 1988), Greek footballer
 Tassos Athanasiadis, Greek writer

Women 
 Agapi Athanasiadi, Greek professional, well known for the capabilities and results in the Greek rally Acropolis
 Anna Athanasiadou, Greek weightlifter
 Maria Athanasiadou, Greek singer
 Despoina Athanasiadou, Greek Graduated psychologist

Greek-language surnames
Surnames
Patronymic surnames